is a Japanese professional basketball player.  He currently plays for the Alvark Tokyo club of the B.League in Japan.

He represented Japan's national basketball team at the 2017 FIBA Asia Cup, where he was Japan’s best passer and 3 point shooter.

Career statistics 

|-
| align="left" | 2013-14
| align="left" | Toyota
| 19|| 0|| 11.5|| .547|| .300|| .800|| 1.5|| 1.2|| 0.3|| 0.1||  4.3
|-
| align="left" | 2014-15
| align="left" | Toyota
| 54|| || 27.6|| .481|| .407|| .843|| 2.2|| 2.4|| 1.3|| 0.2|| 11.6
|-
| align="left" | 2015-16
| align="left" | Toyota
| 47|| || 25.6|| .440|| .349|| .835|| 1.9|| 2.5|| 1.0|| 0.1||  11.5
|-
|align="left" | 2016-17
| align="left" | A Tokyo
|62||59||29.7||.447||.410||.769||3.1||2.6||1.5||.1||13.4
|-
|align="left" | 2017-18
| align="left" | A Tokyo
|58||56||29.3||.442||.360||.787||2.0||5.1||1.2||.1||12.5
|-
|align="left" | 2018-19
| align="left" | A Tokyo
|49||47||27.4||.457||.301||.781||2.2||4.5||1.1||.1||10.1
|-

References

External links
 FIBA Asia Cup 2017 profile
 Asia-basket.com profile
 Real GM profile
 Proballers profile

1991 births
Living people
Tokai University alumni
Alvark Tokyo players
Shooting guards
Japanese men's basketball players
People from Nagasaki
Asian Games bronze medalists for Japan
Asian Games medalists in basketball
Basketball players at the 2014 Asian Games
Medalists at the 2014 Asian Games
2019 FIBA Basketball World Cup players
Basketball players at the 2020 Summer Olympics
Olympic basketball players of Japan